The Hospital Universitario Infanta Leonor is a general hospital managed under a public–private partnership model, located at the neighborhood of Santa Eugenia,in the Villa de Vallecas district in Madrid, Spain. It is part of the network of hospitals of the Servicio Madrileño de Salud (SERMAS).

It is one of the healthcare institutions associated to the Complutense University of Madrid (UCM) for the purpose of clinical internship.

History 
It was opened on 29 February 2008. Featuring a built surface of  square metres, it has 264 hospitalary beds and 11 operating rooms.

It became a centre directly managed by the SERMAS in 2016.

In 2017 the Hospital Virgen de la Torre became part of the organization of the Infanta Leonor from a legal standpoint. In 2019, DIF, a Dutch investment fund, acquired the whole hospital.

Its medical emergency services collapsed in March 2020, during the ongoing COVID-19 pandemic, with patients lying on the floor of the hospital corridors.

References 

Villa de Vallecas
Infanta Leonor
2008 establishments in Spain
Hospital buildings completed in 2008